The St George River, or sometimes incorrectly Saint George River, is a perennial river of the Corangamite catchment, located in the Otways region of the Australian state of Victoria.

Location and features
From its highest point, the river descends  over its  course.

See also

References

External links

Corangamite catchment
Rivers of Barwon South West (region)
Otway Ranges